Christian Borel (born 13 November 1956) is a French former professional footballer who played as a forward. He most notably played for Lille and Bastia in the Division 1.

References 

1956 births
Living people
Footballers from Caen
French footballers
Association football forwards
INF Vichy players
Lille OSC players
SC Bastia players
SAS Épinal players
French Division 3 (1971–1993) players
Ligue 1 players